Kristian is a name in several languages, and is a form of Christian.

Meaning in different languages
The name is used in several languages, among them Albanian, Slovak, Danish, Finnish, Norwegian, Swedish, Bosnian, Macedonian, Bulgarian and Croatian.

In some languages people with the name are sometimes named after the cross, not after Christ. The word cross in Bulgarian, Macedonian, Serbian is kr'st and in Russian is krest, in some cases pronounced krist. In contrast Christ in these Slavic languages is called Hristos, which confuses to which of both nouns the name sounds more similar. The name may have a third meaning in Bulgarian and Macedonian, in which the word kr'sten means baptized and has the same  as the word for cross.

Though sounding similar, the words cross and Christian have different roots, Christian derives from the Koine Greek word Christós, possibly ultimately derived from the Egyptian kheru, "word" or "voice", used to replace the Biblical Hebrew term mashiach, "anointed". On the other the hand the Slavic and the English word for cross comes from the Latin word crux (cruci) "stake" which is perhaps of Phoenician or Punic (Phoenicio-Carthaginian) origin. It may come from the Latin word crio, "to torment".

 Kristián (Czech, Slovak)
 Kristijan (Bosnian)
 Kristian (Estonian, Finnish, Danish, Norwegian, Croatian or Swedish)
 Kristjan (Estonian, Faroese, Slovenian)
 Kristian, Kristi, Kristo (Albanian)
 Kristján (Icelandic)
 Kristijan Croatian
 Kristiāns (Latvian)
 Kristijonas (Lithuanian)
 Krystian (Polish)
 Krisztián, Keresztény, for the Danish kings Keresztély (Hungarian)
 Крістіан, Християн, (Kristian, Hristiyan) (Ukrainian)
 Христиан, Hristian (Serbian)
 Кристијан or Христијан (Kristijan or Hristijan) (Macedonian)
 Кристиян, Кристиан, Христо or Християн (Kristiyan, Kristian, Hristo or Hristiyan) (Bulgarian)
 ख्रीष्टियन (Khrīṣṭiyana) (Nepali)
 ಕ್ರಿಶ್ಚಿಯನ್ (Kriściyan) (Kannada)
 క్రిస్టియన్(Krisṭiyan) (Telugu)
 கிரிஸ்துவர் (Kiristuvar) (Tamil)
 คริสเตียน (Khris̄teīyn) (Thai)

Males with the given name Kristian
Kristian Digby (1977–2010), British television presenter and director
Kristian Doolittle (born 1997), American basketball player for Hapoel Eilat of the Israeli Basketball Premier League
Kristian Fulton (born 1998), American football player
Kristian Jensen (born 1971), Danish politician
Kristian Gestrin (1929–1990), Finnish judge and politician
Kristian Hansen Kofoed (1879–1951), Danish civil servant and politician
Kristian Løken (1884–1961), Norwegian army officer
Kristian Roebuck (born 1981), English badminton player
Kristian Rogers (born 1980), English footballer
Kristian Seeber (born 1980), American drag queen
Kristian Vikernes (born 1973), Norwegian musician and murderer
Kristian Welch (born 1998), American football player
Kristian Wilkerson (born 1997), American football player
Kristian Kostov (born 2000), Bulgarian-Russian singer

Surname
 David Kristian (born 1967), Canadian musician
 Giles Kristian (born 1975), British author
 Marty Kristian (born 1947), German-Australian singer

See also 
 Cristian (disambiguation)

References 

Scandinavian masculine given names
Bulgarian masculine given names
Croatian masculine given names
Danish masculine given names
Norwegian masculine given names
Slovak masculine given names
Swedish masculine given names
Finnish masculine given names